Aldehuela may refer to:

Places in Spain
La Aldehuela, municipality in the province of Ávila Castile and León
Las Aldehuelas, municipality in the province of Soria, Castile and León

Aldehuela de Periáñez, municipality in the province of Soria

Aldehuela del Codonal, municipality in the province of Segovia, Castile and León
Aldehuela de Jerte, municipality in the province of Cáceres, Extremadura

Aldehuela de Liestos, municipality in the province of Zaragoza, Aragon

Aldehuela de Yeltes, municipality in the province of Salamanca, Castile and León
Aldehuela de la Bóveda, municipality in the province of Salamanca
Castle of Aldehuela, between Jaén and Torredelcampo, Jaén

People
Martín de Aldehuela (1729–1802), Spanish architect

See also